Mongolian Chinese usually refer to ethnic Mongols in China. 

Mongolian Chinese might also refer to:
Mongolians in Taiwan (Republic of China)
Mixed race people of Han Chinese and Mongol descent

See also
Chinese Mongolian, also known as ethnic Chinese in Mongolia